Amkette, is a multinational technology company and manufacturer of computer hardware and consumer electronics, headquartered in New Delhi, India. The company launched a smart TV product called EvoTV in 2012.

The company has a pan-India distribution network and heavily invests in hardware and software R&D. Its manufacturing facility is in China while the software team is based in Bangalore, India.

In November 2014, the company launched a headphone with a sharing jack, Trubeats Tango, that allows listeners to connect additional listening devices to the headphone.

In December 2016, the company launched the successor of its flagship product Evo TV 2 4k capable of playing 4k content. In the subsequent year, the company launched the next generation of Evo Tv, the Evo Tv 3 4K with an upgraded 2GB of RAM.

After a decade of the launch of Amkette TV Box which converted normal TVs into smart TVs, In 2021, the company introduced its flagship product, EvoFox Game box in the Indian market.

Projects
 Android Gaming Evo Gamepad - bluetooth controller that allows console style gaming on mobile phones combined with the Android Evo Gaming app. This is the first of many gaming devices that the company is planning to launch. 
 Apple certified Mfi cable - launched in December 2014, certified with Apple in two variations, 8 pin (for iPhone 5/5c/5s/6/6Plus) and 32 pin (for 3g/4/4s)
 Trubeats Tango - launched in November 2014, a one of a kind headphone with a sharing jack (aux out)
 EvoTV - launched mid-2012; a range of connected TV devices that converge web and multimedia features onto a TV
 Amkette Acoustix - a lab within the Amkette R&D wing  focussing on developing new sound drivers for headphones and headsets
EvoFox Gaming - Amkette introduced the EvoFox Gaming Accessories with the launch of the EvoFox Fireblade TKL gaming keyboard in 2020. Ever since then the company has launched a number of different products under EvoFox Gaming. Amkette’s flagship product Evo Game Box TV and Evo Gamepad Pro 4 falls under the same category.

History

Amkette was started by Rajiv Bapna in 1984. It became one of the largest manufacturers and exporters of floppy diskettes from India, selling to Russia and other countries in Europe. The diskettes plant was started with the help of German technology. The plant manufactured 8", 5.25" and 3.5" diskettes. At its peak it had a production capacity of 30 million floppies daily. The plant was shut down in Jan 2013 and completely converted into a R&D center.

Current product categories

Wireless products

Since early 2010 the company has been into the wireless segment and has introduced a wide range of wireless products. Under this category, keyboards and mice that run on either bluetooth or wireless spectrum technology have been introduced.

Personal technology and audio

The company has a wide range of headphones and headsets for personal and business use including headsets that run on Bluetooth and wireless spectrum technology such as Air Budz and Urban series.

Peripherals

Since the very beginning, the company has been manufacturing computer peripherals such as keyboards and mice, USB hubs, card readers, and HDMI cables.

Accessories 
Amkette has a range of smartphone accessories.

Multimedia devices

The company has a range of multimedia devices that work on Android platforms and can be connected to a TV. Amkette began development and marketing of media players in late 2009, by introducing the Flash TV 720p media player. In early 2011 the company launched FlashTV HD 1080p, which was a Full HD media player. In mid-2012, the company launched a new media player called Amkette EvoTV, which was again a Full HD mediapPlayer powered by Android. All these devices support almost every audio and video format.

See also
List of Amkette products

References

Indian brands
Indian companies established in 1984
Computer peripheral companies
Manufacturing companies based in Delhi
Information technology companies of India
Floppy disk computer storage